Warm is the second studio album by American musician Jeff Tweedy, released on November 30, 2018 by dBpm Records. It is his first solo album of entirely new material.

It was released shortly after the release of Tweedy's memoir, Let's Go (So We Can Get Back).

Critical reception

Warm has received positive reviews from critics. At Metacritic, which assigns a normalised rating out of 100 to reviews from mainstream publications, the album received an average score of 84, based on 21 reviews.

Track listing

Personnel
Credits adapted from liner notes.

Musicians
 Jeff Tweedy – vocals, songwriting, instruments
 Spencer Tweedy – drums , synthesizer 
 Sammy Tweedy – backing vocals , synthesizer 
 Glenn Kotche – drums 
 Ava Brennan – backing vocals 

Technical personnel
 Jeff Tweedy – production, engineering [with], mixing [with], design
 Tom Schick – mixing, engineering, production [with]
 Bob Ludwig – mastering
 Mark Greenberg – assistant engineering, studio management, design
 Spencer Tweedy – design
 Sammy Tweedy – photography
 Sheila Sachs – design
 Phoebe Randall – title constellation illustration
 George Saunders – liner notes
 Jacob Daneman – publicity
 Jessica Linker – publicity
 Sam McAllister – publicity
 Frank Riley – booking
 Dawn Nepp – financial management
 Josh Grier – legal
 Davi Rodrigues de Lima – lacquer cut

Charts

References

2018 albums
DBpm Records albums
Jeff Tweedy albums
Albums produced by Jeff Tweedy